Paddington is an area of the City of Westminster, London.

Paddington may also refer to:

Places
 Metropolitan Borough of Paddington, a historic sub-division of the County of London
 London Paddington station, a major railway station in London
 Paddington tube station (Circle and Hammersmith & City lines), a London Underground station serving the mainline station
 Paddington tube station (Bakerloo, Circle and District lines), a London Underground station serving the mainline station
 Paddington Bridge or Bishop's Bridge, a road bridge in London
 Paddington, New South Wales, a suburb of Sydney, Australia
 Electoral district of Paddington (New South Wales)
 Paddington, Queensland, a suburb of Brisbane, Australia
 Electoral district of Paddington (Queensland)
 Paddington, Western Australia, an abandoned Goldfields town, now called Gudarra
 Souk-el-Khemis Airfield, an abandoned airfield in Tunisia known by the codename "Paddington"
 Paddington, Cheshire, a settlement now part of the civil parish of Woolston within the township of Warrington

Arts and entertainment
 Paddington Bear, a fictional character in children's literature
 Paddington (TV series), the first TV series to feature Paddington Bear
 Paddington Bear (TV series), a 1989 TV series
 The Adventures of Paddington Bear, a 1997 TV series
 The Adventures of Paddington (2019 TV series)
 Paddington (film series)
 Paddington (film), a 2014 film based on the fictional character Paddington Bear
 Paddington 2, the 2017 sequel

People
 Bert Paddington (born 1881), English footballer with Southampton and Brighton & Hove Albion
 Paddington Mhondoro (1986–2015), Zimbabwean cricketer

Other uses
 Paddington Gold Mine, a gold mine in Western Australia

See also
 4.50 from Paddington, a novel by Agatha Christie
 Paddington Green (disambiguation)